Prime Suspect is a 1989 American thriller directed by Bruce Kimmel and produced by Alain Silver and Patrick Regan. Bruce Kimmel also composed the underscore. The film stars Don Blakely, Tom Bresnahan and Ann Dane.

Cast
 Don Blakely as Joey
 Tom Bresnahan as Tod Jennings
 Ann Dane as Nurse Barton
 Crisstyn Dante as Nurse Edgar
 Billy Drago as Cyril
 Suzanne Dunne as Reporter
 Robert Hoover as Janitor
 Tamara J. Hufford as Mrs. Masters
 Mark Keyloun as Sgt. Blaze
 Robert F. Lyons as Sheriff Hank Fallon
 Susan Strasberg as Dr. Celia Warren
 Doug McClure as Dr. Brand
 Michael Parks as Bill Nevins
 Dana Plato as Diana Masters
 Frank Stallone as Gene Chambers

References

External links
 
 

1989 films
1989 thriller films
American thriller films
1980s English-language films
1980s American films